Wild Goose Creek, originally known as Cedar Creek to the early travelers on the Mormon Road, is a stream, in Millard County, Utah.

See also
List of rivers of Utah

References

Rivers of Utah
Mormon Road
Rivers of Millard County, Utah